Nick Gorman (born 7 July 1965) is a television and film director based in the United Kingdom. Gorman graduated from Dartington College of Arts with a degree in Theatre.

Filmography

External links 
 
 http://www.tv.com/nick-gorman/person/162167/blog.html

British film directors
British television directors
Living people
1965 births